Franks Diner is a Jerry O'Mahony Diner Company lunch car diner in Kenosha, Wisconsin.

Notable features
The diner seats 55 patrons and is noted for the numerous slogans posted on the walls, such as "Order what you want, eat what you get." The diner's signature dish is the Garbage Plate, a large omelette cooked together with hash browns and meat.

History
The dining car was built in Bayonne, New Jersey, in 1926, and transported on a railroad flat car to Kenosha. It was then pulled by six horses to the downtown spot, near the shoreline of Lake Michigan, where it stands today. Anthony Franks, who first learned of the restaurant opportunity through a magazine article, paid  plus $325 in shipping charges to launch Franks' Diner.

Over the years, there have been few changes in the structural appearance of the diner. The original lunch car has an open grill and counter with 17 stools. A small dining room, which now contains seven booths, was added in 1935 and a larger kitchen in the mid-1940s.

The Franks family operated Franks Diner continuously until 2001 when they sold it to Lynn Groleau, Chris Schwartz, and Kris Derwae. Derwae sold her share to Groleau and Schwartz in 2006.

In December 2010, Kevin Ervin and Julie Rittmiller purchased the restaurant and said they have no plans for changes in Franks Diner's operations.

Many renovations have been completed on Franks Diner since 2001. The original kitchen, then pantry, was renovated into an additional dining area. The arched wooden ceiling and much woodwork was restored. Removing layers of paint uncovered the original "Franks DINER" hand-lettered sign painted on what was the outer side of the original dining car, now facing the inside of the main dining area.

Celebrity patrons
In past years, Vaudeville and other entertainment acts at local theaters were popular. Many performers, including The Three Stooges, Bela Lugosi, Duke Ellington, Liberace and members of the Lawrence Welk orchestra, dined at Franks. Recent celebrity sightings include Chicago news anchor Ron Magers; New York weather presenter and actor Lonnie Quinn; and Peter Tork of The Monkees; and Food Network host Guy Fieri, who featured the diner on Diners, Drive-Ins and Dives. Franks Diner has been featured in numerous other television shows, travel magazines, newspapers and radio programs.

References

External links
 

Restaurants in Wisconsin
Buildings and structures in Kenosha, Wisconsin
Diners in the United States
Tourist attractions in Kenosha County, Wisconsin
Restaurants established in 1926
Commercial buildings completed in 1926
1926 establishments in Wisconsin